Eva Hartree  (née Rayner) (24 December 1873 – 9 September 1947) was the first woman to be Mayor of Cambridge, in 1924–25.

Early life
Hartree was born Eva Rayner in Stockport in 1873, the daughter of a Jewish doctor, Edwin Rayner and his wife Isabella.

Hartree read natural history at Girton College, Cambridge from 1892, completing tripos in 1895, but not graduating as women did not then proceed to graduation. Also in 1895 she married William Hartree, a lecturer in engineering. She was a suffragist (not a more militant suffragette).

Civic career
Hartree was a Borough Councillor from 1921 to 1927, during which time she was the first woman to be Mayor of Cambridge in 1924–25. As a result of suffering from Graves' disease, she had a short period off the council, but was again a Councillor from 1929 to 1943. Hartree was President of the National Council of Women of Great Britain in 1933. After her husband died in 1943, she resigned from the council and moved to London, to work with refugees.

Personal life
The Hartrees had six children, only two of whom survived beyond infancy, and only one of those two to adulthood. The surviving son was Douglas Rayner Hartree, who became Plummer Professor of Mathematical Physics. Her niece through her brother Edwin, (who became a senior figure at the National Physical Laboratory) was geologist Dorothy Helen Rayner. The Hartrees lived at 21 Bentley Road, Trumpington. During the time after William Hartree died and Eva Hartree lived in London, the house was occupied by the scientist John Baker.

Her husband died in 1943, and Hartree herself died in 1947.

Legacy
The Clay Farm community centre in Trumpington has an Eva Hartree Hall. Her photographic portrait in mayoral robes by Olive Edis is held by the National Portrait Gallery.

References

1873 births
1947 deaths
Alumni of Girton College, Cambridge
Councillors in Cambridgeshire
Mayors of Cambridge
British social reformers
Women mayors of places in England
Presidents of the National Council of Women of Great Britain
20th-century English women
20th-century English people
Women councillors in England